Elisabeth Dos-Kellner (born 16 January 1966) is an Austrian Paralympic alpine skier. She represented Austria in Para-alpine skiing at the 1988 Paralympic Winter Games, and 1994 Paralympic Winter Games. She won four medals: three gold medals and a silver medal.

Career 
She competed at the 1988 Winter Paralympics in Innsbruck, in the B2 category, Kellner won two gold medals: in giant slalom (with a time of 1:58.27), and downhill (race ended in 0:53.24).

She competed at the 1994 Winter Paralympics in Lillehammer, Norway. She took gold in the giant slalom B1-2 race (achieved time of 2:50.31), and silver in alpine super combined B1-2, in 1:18.89 (on the podium, gold for Gabriele Huemer in 1:18.89 and bronze for Joanne Duffy in 1:27.74).

References 

1966 births
Living people
Paralympic alpine skiers of Austria
Austrian female alpine skiers
Paralympic gold medalists for Austria
Paralympic silver medalists for Austria
Paralympic bronze medalists for Austria
Alpine skiers at the 1988 Winter Paralympics
Alpine skiers at the 1992 Winter Paralympics
Alpine skiers at the 1994 Winter Paralympics
Alpine skiers at the 1998 Winter Paralympics
Medalists at the 1988 Winter Paralympics
Medalists at the 1992 Winter Paralympics
Medalists at the 1994 Winter Paralympics
Medalists at the 1998 Winter Paralympics
20th-century Austrian women